Domala was an 8,441-ton cargo liner which was built in 1920 and launched as Magnava. Following damage sustained in an air attack in 1940, she was rebuilt as a cargo ship and renamed Empire Attendant. In 1942 she was torpedoed and sunk with the loss of all crew.

History

Domala
Domala was the first ship in the British India Steam Navigation Company's fleet powered by diesel engines. She was built by Barclay, Curle and Company, Whiteinch, Glasgow and launched on 23 December 1920 as Magnava and completed as Domala  on 14 December 1921. Her engines were built by the North British Diesel Engine Works, Whiteinch.

Domala made her maiden voyage on 30 December 1921, arriving at Bombay, India on 27 January. From Bombay, Domala sailed to  Karachi, India before returning to London. Domala had accommodation for 158 saloon-class passengers and 11,000 tons of cargo.

She was used on the service to and from Calcutta. On 6 October 1927, she collided with the British cargo ship  in the River Humber, severely damaging her. On 12 August 1934, Domala ran into the stern of Thames Barge Shannon at Erith, Kent.

In 1940, Domala was sent to Antwerp to collect a number of Indian seamen who had been repatriated by Germany. On 2 March 1940, off St Catherine's Point on the Isle of Wight, she was attacked by a Heinkel He 111H flown by Martin Harlinghausen. The bomber of Kampfgeschwader 26 dropped two sticks of bombs, setting Domala on fire. The order to abandon ship was given but the bomber machine-gunned the ship. A total of 108 of the 291 people on board the ship were killed. The Dutch ship Jong Willem rescued 48 survivors, despite being attacked herself. The destroyer  and Avro Anson aircraft of 48 Squadron assisted in the rescue. On fire, Domala was towed to the Solent where she was beached between Hurst Castle and The Needles on 6 March. She was refloated on 15 March and on 19 March, she was towed to Southampton where the decision was made to convert her to a cargo ship.

Surgeon Lieutenant MacDonald was Mentioned in Despatches for his zeal and devotion to duty, and skill in attending to the wounded survivors. For their actions Chief Officer William Brawn and Cadet Bernard John Duval, both crew on Domala, were awarded the King's Commendation for Brave Conduct. Cadet Duval, Merchant Navy was awarded the Lloyd's War Medal for Bravery at Sea; the citation reads: "The ship was attacked during darkness by an enemy aircraft, which dropped a bomb, putting the main engines out of action and setting her on fire. She also carried a number of lascars captured from various vessels by an enemy raider, who were being taken home. Many were hurt and some killed. At great risk to himself, Cadet Duval, a lad of seventeen, gave a fine example of bravery, doing all he could to save his second officer's life".

As a result of the attack, questions were asked in Parliament by Manny Shinwell about the lack of use of the guns carried on Domala in her defence. Winston Churchill replied that the aircraft that attacked Domala had been initially misidentified as a friendly one, which was why the guns were not manned. A British destroyer also misidentified the aircraft. It was also asked why the gunners were not always manning the guns. In India, there was public anger towards Germany as a result of the attack. Eighty-one of those killed were Indian citizens.

Domala was requisitioned by the Ministry of War Transport and renamed Empire Attendant.

Empire Attendant
Empire Attendant  was entirely reconstructed. She was placed under the management of Andrew Weir & Co (Bank Line). Empire Attendant took part in a number of convoys during the war.

HX 97

Empire Attendant was due to have been a member of Convoy HX 97, but did not sail with the convoy.

HX 120

Convoy HX 120 sailed from Halifax, Nova Scotia on 10 April 1941 and arrived at Liverpool on 29 April. Empire Attendant was carrying a cargo of 350 tons of steel and also explosives.

OS 33

Convoy OS 33 sailed from Liverpool on 1 July 1942. On 10 July 1942  reported that Empire Attendant had broken down for the seventh time and was straggling, being at least  behind the convoy. The crew are commemorated on panel 38 of the Tower Hill Memorial.

Engines
Domala was powered by two 8-cylinder diesel engines, type 4SSA. Cylinders were 873 mm bore, 1194 mm stroke. The engines were built by the North East Diesel Engine Company.

Official Number and code letters
Official Numbers were a forerunner to IMO Numbers.

Domala and Empire Attendant had the UK Official Number 146266 and used the Code Letters GDMV

Citations

References
 

Ships built on the River Clyde
1920 ships
Cargo liners
Merchant ships of the United Kingdom
Empire ships
Ministry of War Transport ships
Ships sunk by German submarines in World War II
Maritime incidents in March 1940
Maritime incidents in July 1942